The United Counties of Prescott and Russell  are consolidated counties located in the Canadian province of Ontario. Its county seat is L'Orignal. It was created as a result of a merger between Russell County and Prescott County in 1820. It is located in Eastern Ontario, in the wedge-shaped area between the Ottawa River and St. Lawrence River, approximately 55 km (35 miles) east of the City of Ottawa.

Geography and nature

The United Counties are bordered by the Ontario/Quebec border to the east, and the Ottawa River to the north.  It is crossed by the South Nation River that connects the Larose Forest and Alfred Bog. Ontario Ministry of Natural Resources has designated the Alfred Bog "a provincially significant wetland and an Area of Natural and Scientific Interest." Species of interest include the palm warbler, northern pitcher-plant, pink lady's-slipper, cottongrass, bog elfin and bog copper butterflies, and ebony boghaunter dragonfly. It also hosts one of the most southerly herds of moose. The bog is open to the public with a 272-metre (297 yard) boardwalk for nature walks.

Subdivisions
Municipalities and townships with major unincorporated communities:
 Township of Alfred and Plantagenet (part of Prescott sub-region)
 Alfred
 Plantagenet
 Municipality of Casselman (part of Russell sub-region)
 Township of Champlain (part of Prescott sub-region)
 L'Orignal
 Vankleek Hill
 City of Clarence-Rockland (part of Russell sub-region)
 Rockland
 Bourget
 Township of East Hawkesbury (part of Prescott sub-region)
 Town of Hawkesbury (part of Prescott sub-region)
 Township of Russell (part of Russell sub-region)
 Embrun
 Russell
 Municipality of The Nation (part of Prescott and Russell sub-regions)
 Limoges
 St. Isidore

Historical townships
 Prescott County
 Alfred (now part of Alfred and Plantagenet)
 Caledonia (now part of The Nation)
 East Hawkesbury (still exists)
 Longueuil (now part of Champlain)
 North Plantagenet (now part of Alfred and Plantagenet)
 South Plantagenet (now part of The Nation)
 West Hawkesbury (now part of Champlain)
 Russell County
 Cambridge (now part of The Nation)
 Clarence (still exists as part of Clarence-Rockland)
 Cumberland (transferred to Carleton County, now part of the City of Ottawa)
 Russell (still exists)

Demographics

The median income for a household in the county was $78,748 and the median income for a family is $94,067.  Males had an average income of $44,781 versus $33,240 for females.

Languages
In 2016 French was the sole mother tongue of 63.0% of its residents, and an additional 1.8% reported being natively bilingual in French and English.

Services

Responsibilities of the county government include social services (social assistance, child care, housing), county roads, paramedic / ambulance services and land-use planning. The county also operates the Prescott-Russell Residence, a home for the aged in Hawkesbury.

Libraries
There are many public libraries located in the county. The largest is the Hawkesbury Public Library, which is located in Hawkesbury.

Health
There is 1 hospital in Prescott-Russell: Hawkesbury and District General Hospital, in Hawkesbury, Ontario. Also, there is a medevac helicopter, in Ottawa, Ontario.

Transit

The counties are served by numerous commuter bus lines running to Ottawa, which are mainly operated by private contractors.  The route numbers are part of the Rural Partners Transit Service of OC Transpo.  Communities served include Rockland (with 10-12 trips in rush hour), Hawkesbury, Bourget, Casselman, Russell, and Embrun.

Police
The county is policed by the Ontario Provincial Police (OPP). There are two main police stations in Prescott and Russell; one in Embrun and one in Hawkesbury. In addition, there is a police station in Rockland that acts as a satellite to the one in Embrun. The OPP is also in charge of patrolling Highway 417.

See also
 List of municipalities in Ontario
 List of townships in Ontario
 Prescott and Russell Recreational Trail
 St. Davids
 List of secondary schools in Ontario#Prescott and Russell United Counties

References

External links

 
United counties in Ontario